The 1934–35 Lancashire Cup was the 27th occasion on which the Lancashire Cup completion had been held. Salford won the trophy  by beating  Wigan by 21-12 in the final.

Competition and results  

The number of teams entering this year’s competition remained at 13 and the same fixture format was retained. There was only one bye in the first round but now also a “blank” or “dummy” fixture. This also resulted in one bye in the second round.

Round 1  
Involved  6 matches (with one bye and one “blank” fixture) and 13 clubs

Round 2 – quarterfinals  
Involved 3 matches (with one bye) and 7 clubs

Round 2 – quarterfinals -  First replays  
Involved 1 match

Round 2 – quarterfinals  - Second replays 
Involved 1 match

Round 3 – semifinals 
Involved 2 matches and 4 clubs

Final 

The match was played at Station Road, Pendlebury, Salford, (historically in the county of Lancashire). he attendance of 33,544 was a new record and more than 5,000 more than the previous best recorded in 1931, and receipts were also a record £2,191. This would turn out to be only the first of three consecutive Lancashire Cup finals in which Salford would beat Wigan.

Teams and scorers 

Scoring - Try = three (3) points - Goal = two (2) points - Drop goal = two (2) points

The road to success

Notes and comments 

1 * The first Lancashire Cup match to be played at this stadium and also by this (newly formed/named) club

2 *This second replay was played at a Neutral Ground according to St. Helens official archives, but no ground is named.

3 * The attendance of 33,544 was a new record and more than 5,000 more than the previous best,  and receipts were also a record £2191/=/=.

4 * Station Road was the home ground of Swinton from 1929 to 1992 and at its peak was one of the finest rugby league grounds in the country and it boasted a capacity of 60,000. The actual record attendance was for the Challenge Cup semi-final on 7 April 1951 when 44,621 watched Wigan beat Warrington 3-2

See also 
1934–35 Northern Rugby Football League season
Rugby league county cups

References

External links
Saints Heritage Society
1896–97 Northern Rugby Football Union season at wigan.rlfans.com
Hull&Proud Fixtures & Results 1896/1897
Widnes Vikings - One team, one passion Season In Review - 1896-97
The Northern Union at warringtonwolves.org

RFL Lancashire Cup
Lancashire Cup